Nea Apollonia is a village and a community of the Volvi municipality. Before the 2011 local government reform it was part of the municipality of Apollonia, of which it was a municipal district. The 2011 census recorded 1,851 inhabitants in the village and 1,922 inhabitants in the community. The community of Nea Apollonia covers an area of 70.855 km2.

Administrative division
The community of Volvi consists of four separate settlements: 
Loutra Volvis (population 54)
Mesopotamo (population 17)
Nea Apollonia (population 1,851)
The aforementioned population figures are as of 2011.

See also
 List of settlements in the Thessaloniki regional unit

References

Populated places in Thessaloniki (regional unit)